This is a list of notable software for haplotype estimation and genotype imputation.

Alphabetical order:
 AlphaImpute
 Beagle
 cnF2freq
 DAGPHASE
 Eagle
 fastPHASE
 FILLIN (part of TASSEL)
 FImpute
 findhap
 FSFHap (part of TASSEL)
 HAPI-UR
 IMPUTE2
 LDMIP
 LinkImpute
 LinkImputeR
 MACH
 PHASE
 PlantImpute
 SHAPEIT2
 SHAPEIT3
 SHAPEIT4
 SimWalk2
 SNPHAP
STITCH
 WhatsHap

References

Computational biology
Genetics databases
Haplo
Lists of software